The Mérida Mexico Temple is the 92nd operating temple of the Church of Jesus Christ of Latter-day Saints (LDS Church).

History
The building of the temple in Mérida, Yucatán, was announced on September 25, 1998. It is one of thirteen temples in Mexico.

A groundbreaking ceremony and site dedication were held on January 16, 1999 with Carl B. Pratt, a member of the Seventy and president of the México South Area, presiding. The area is rich with history and the temple site is close to some of the most famous archeological ruins, such as Uxmal and Chichen Itza. There are more than 13,000 members just in Mérida and many more members throughout the area that the temple will serve.
 
The Mérida Mexico Temple was open for tours to the public June 24 through July 1, 2000. Those who toured the  temple were able to see the two ordinance rooms, the celestial room, two sealing rooms, the baptistery, and learn more about LDS beliefs.

Thomas S. Monson, a member of the LDS Church First Presidency, dedicated the temple on July 8, 2000. Four sessions of the dedication were held which allowed more than 5,400 members to attend the services. The Mérida Mexico Temple serves 33,000 members in nine stakes and six districts in Mexico and Belize.

In 2020, the Mérida Mexico Temple was closed in response to the coronavirus pandemic.

See also

 Comparison of temples of The Church of Jesus Christ of Latter-day Saints
 List of temples of The Church of Jesus Christ of Latter-day Saints
 List of temples of The Church of Jesus Christ of Latter-day Saints by geographic region
 Temple architecture (Latter-day Saints)
 The Church of Jesus Christ of Latter-day Saints in Mexico

References

Additional reading

External links

 
Mérida Mexico Temple Official site
Mérida Mexico Temple at ChurchofJesusChristTemples.org

20th-century Latter Day Saint temples
Buildings and structures in Yucatán
Mérida, Yucatán
Temples (LDS Church) completed in 2000
Temples (LDS Church) in Mexico
2000 establishments in Mexico